The Bendi languages are a small group of languages spoken in Cross River State, southeastern Nigeria. Bokyi is one of the Bendi languages having some speakers in Cameroon. Once counted among the Cross River languages, they may be a branch of Southern Bantoid, with observed similarities especially with the Ekoid languages.

Very little research has been conducted on the Bendi languages, and the modern work that does exist often remains either unpublished or inaccessible. The group is notable for having one language (Ubang) that has male and female forms.

Languages
The Obudu-Obanlikwu-Eastern Boki languages are:
Alege, Obanliku, Bekwarra, Bete-Bendi, Bokyi, Bumaji, Utugwang, Ubang, Ukpe-Bayobiri.
The data is too poorly covered to allow for detailed internal classification of these languages.

Names and locations
Below is a list of language names, populations, and locations from Blench (2019).

Numerals
Comparison of numerals in individual languages:

See also
Bendi word lists (Wiktionary)

References

External links
ComparaLex, database with Bendi word lists